The Eye of the Storm is a 2009 Brazilian drama film directed by Eduardo Valente. It was given a special screening at the 2009 Cannes Film Festival.

Cast
 Marcio Vito as José Maria
 Dedina Bernardelli as Elisa
 Licurgo Spinola as Fernando
 Luca De Castro as Jaime
 Malu Rocha as Dona Fátima
 Luciana Bezerra as Sandra
 Raphael Sil as Beto

References

External links
 

2009 films
2000s Portuguese-language films
2009 drama films
Brazilian drama films